NGC 474 is an elliptical galaxy about 100 million light years distant in the constellation Pisces. This large galaxy is known to possess tidal shells and tidal tails, although their origins remain unclear. One possible explanation is that NGC 474 interacted with a galaxy several billion years ago.

Structure
The origins of the spectacular tidal features around NGC 474 have been extensively studied, and some possible explanations have been published. The authors of one study argued that the tidal tails were formed because of a collision with a galaxy 2 billion years ago. The same study also stated that NGC 474 is absorbing gas from its neighbor, NGC 470, since the ancient collision.  In another model, the tidal shells can be explained by a gas-rich spiral galaxy colliding with NGC 474 twice, before finally merging. NGC 474 is moving away from the Sun at a rate of 2412 km/s due to dark energy. 

In July 2017 a Type Ia supernova designated SN 2017fgc was discovered in NGC 474. It was located at a considerable distance from the galactic nucleus.

Further reading
Turnbull, A. J.; Carter, D.; Bridges, T. J.; Thomson, R. C. (1999) Shell Formation in NGC474

References

External links

Galaxy NGC 474: Cosmic Blender, NASA Astronomy Picture of the Day (8 October 2007)
Shell Galaxies in Pisces, NASA Astronomy Picture of the Day (27 February 2011)
Galaxy NGC 474: Shells and Star Streams, NASA Astronomy Picture of the Day (5 January 2014)
Galaxy NGC 474: Shells and Star Streams, NASA Astronomy Picture of the Day (6 February 2018)

Lenticular galaxies
Shell galaxies
0474
0864
4801
Pisces (constellation)
17841223